Tegyra ( or Τέγυρα), also: Tegyrae was a town of ancient Boeotia, the site of an oracle and temple of Apollo, who was even said to have been born there. It was the site of the Battle of Tegyra in 375 BCE.
It was located north of Lake Copais, above the marshes of the river Melas. Its location has been identified with sparse remains 5 km (3 mi) northeast of Orchomenus, a hill with springs at the base, the head of the Polygira tributary of the Melas. J.M. Fossey, however, placed Tegyra at modern Pyrgos, 7 km. further east, and thought the Polygira site was Homeric Aspledon.

See also
Delos Mountain

Attribution

References

External links
Viotikos kosmos, ancient Tegyra at Wikidot 

Populated places in ancient Boeotia
Classical oracles
Former populated places in Greece